Lobophytum crebliplicatum is a coral species of the genus Lobophytum.

References 

Alcyoniidae
Animals described in 1886